Peter Paul (born March 8, 1957) is a former American actor, producer, television personality and bodybuilder. He and his twin brother David Paul usually acted together in films and were together called "The Barbarian Brothers".

They both appeared in the two-hour Season 3 premiere episode of Knight Rider, "Knight of the Drones".

Filmography

References 

American male actors
American television hosts
American television producers
American bodybuilders
Identical twin male actors
Living people
1957 births
Place of birth missing (living people)
Male actors from Hartford, Connecticut